Zagorič is a suburb of Podgorica, Montenegro.

See also
List of Podgorica neighbourhoods and suburbs#Zagorič

References

Suburbs of Podgorica